Madikizela is a surname. Notable people with the surname include:

Babalo Madikizela, South African urban planner and politician
Bonginkosi Madikizela, South African politician
Pumla Gobodo-Madikizela (born 1955), South African psychologist
Winnie Madikizela-Mandela (1936-2018), South African activist and politician

Xhosa-language surnames